Hyco Creek is a  long 3rd order tributary to the Hyco River in Person County, North Carolina.  Hyco Creek joins the Hyco River within Hyco Lake.  Hyco Creek forms the Hyco River along with South Hyco Creek.

Variant names
According to the Geographic Names Information System, it has also been known historically as:
Hyco River
North Hyco Creek

Course
Hyco Creek rises in a pond about 2 miles east-southeast of Anderson, North Carolina and then flows north-northeast to join the Hyco River about 3 miles east-southeast of Semora, North Carolina.

Watershed
Hyco Creek drains  of area, receives about 46.4 in/year of precipitation, has a wetness index of 376.74, and is about 58% forested.

References

Rivers of North Carolina
Rivers of Caswell County, North Carolina
Rivers of Person County, North Carolina
Tributaries of the Roanoke River